Grupo Exterminador, (formerly known as Los Hermanos Corona between 1991 & 1992) is a Mexican norteño band. Though known for performing various song styles such as rancheras, cumbias, and ballads, they are especially famous for their brash narcocorridos.

History

Grupo Exterminador started in 1992. The band's debut album, Dos Plebes II, was released by EGO Records in 1994. Their biggest chart hit was when their album Nuestras Romanticas reached no.9 on the Billboard charts in 2007, and as of November 2016 their song "El Padre De Todos" has over 7.1 million views on YouTube.

Discography
Corral de Piedra (Los Hermanos Corona 1991)
El Tordillo (Los Hermanos Corona 1992)
El Halcón Traficante (Los Hermanos Corona 1993)
Dos Plebes II (1994) (First Album and only on EGO Records)
Me Gusta Ponerle al Polvo (1995) (First album on Fonovisa)
Dedicado a Mis Novias (1996)
Corridos Perrones 1 (1996)
Narco Corridos 2 (1997)
El Chile Pelaiz (1997)
Contrabando en los Huevos (1999)
Los Corridos Más Torones (2000)
La Pedrada (2000)
Reunión de Perrones (2001)
A Calzón Quitado (2002)
Narco Corridos Vol.3 De parranda con el Diablo (2003)
El Hijo de México (2005)
Ahora con los Huevos en la Mano (2006)
Adicto a Ti (2007)
Duelo de Valientes:Corridos endiablados (2008) (Last album officially on Fonovisa)
La Fiesta (2010) (First album on Skalona Records)
El Punto Exacto (2012) (Album with Banda music)
Pachangón en el Infierno (2013)
Es Tiempo de Exterminador (2014-2015)
Reparar Tú Corazón (2016)
Liberal (2017)
El Hueso (2018)
Los Dos Cabrones (2019)

References

Mexican musical groups
Musical groups established in 1995
Fonovisa Records artists